National Primary Route 6, or just Route 6 (or ) is a National Road Route of Costa Rica, located in the Alajuela, Guanacaste provinces.

Description
In Alajuela province the route covers Upala canton (Upala, Bijagua, Canalete districts).

In Guanacaste province the route covers Bagaces canton (Río Naranjo district), Cañas canton (Cañas, Palmira districts).

References

Highways in Costa Rica